Zavrazhye is a rural locality (a selo) in Kadyysky District, Kostroma Oblast, Russia. Population: . The director Andrey Tarkovsky was born in this village.

References 

Rural localities in Kostroma Oblast